is a Japanese manga series written and illustrated by Rumiko Takahashi. It was serialized in Shogakukan's shōnen manga magazine Weekly Shōnen Sunday from November 1996 to June 2008, with its chapters collected in 56 tankōbon volumes. The series begins with Kagome Higurashi, a fifteen-year-old middle school girl from modern-day Tokyo who is transported to the Sengoku period after falling into a well in her family shrine, where she meets the half-dog demon, half-human Inuyasha. After the sacred Shikon Jewel re-emerges from deep inside Kagome's body, she accidentally shatters it into dozens of fragments that scatter across Japan. Inuyasha and Kagome set to recover the Jewel's fragments, and through their quest they are joined by the lecherous monk Miroku, the demon slayer Sango, and the fox demon Shippō. Together, they journey to restore the Shikon Jewel before it falls into the hands of the evil half-demon Naraku.

In contrast to the typically comedic nature of much of Takahashi's previous work, Inuyasha deals with a darker and more serious subject matter, using the setting of the Sengoku period to easily display the violent content while still retaining some comedic elements. The manga was adapted into two anime television series by Sunrise. The first series ran for 167 episodes on Yomiuri TV from October 2000 to September 2004. The second series, Inuyasha: The Final Act, ran for 26 episodes from October 2009 to March 2010. Four feature films and an original video animation have also been released. Other merchandise includes video games and a light novel. A sequel anime television series, titled Yashahime: Princess Half-Demon, aired for two seasons from October 2020 to March 2022.

Viz Media licensed the manga, the two anime series, and movies for North America. Both Inuyasha and Inuyasha: The Final Act aired in the United States on Adult Swim (and later on its revived Toonami block) from 2002 to 2015.

As of September 2020, Inuyasha had 50 million copies in circulation, making it one of the best-selling manga series. In 2002, the manga won the 47th Shogakukan Manga Award for the shōnen category.

Plot

In modern-day Tokyo, Kagome Higurashi lives on the grounds of her family's Shinto shrine with her mother, grandfather, and younger brother. On her fifteenth birthday, while searching for her cat, Kagome is dragged into the enshrined  by a centipede demon that emerges from it. Rather than hitting the bottom, Kagome finds herself in another universe which is parallel to her universe - but in the past, during Japan's Sengoku period. Kagome is revealed to be the reincarnation of the now-dead Kikyo. The Shikon Jewel was burned along with Kikyo's body to cast it out of this world entirely, in order to keep it safe from the hands of those who would use its power for evil. Kagome comes across a sleeping boy pinned by a sacred arrow to a tree, learning he is Inuyasha, a half-human, half-demon (yōkai) whom Kikyo pinned to the tree as her final act when he attempted to steal the jewel. Kagome then gets attacked by a centipede demon and desperately frees Inuyasha to kill the centipede demon, but when he turns on her and tries to steal the jewel again, he is subdued with a magical beaded necklace to keep him in line with Kagome saying "sit" or "sit boy", which causes him to violently fall to the ground. The Shikon Jewel is extracted from Kagome's body and taken by a crow demon, which Kagome destroys with an arrow, but in doing so, inadvertently shatters the jewel into many shards that scatter across Japan and into the possession of various demons and humans.

After Inuyasha gains his father's sword Tessaiga, placing him at odds with his older half-brother Sesshomaru, a powerful demon who seeks Tessaiga for himself, he aids Kagome in collecting the shards and dealing with the threats they come across as they are joined by Shippō, a young fox demon. Kikyo is later revived and revealed to have been Inuyasha's lover, but her version of how their falling out occurred brings the events into question. It is when the group is joined by the perverted monk Miroku, whose hand is cursed with a Wind Tunnel that was passed on to him from his grandfather, that they learn that his family's curse and the events which resulted in Inuyasha's imprisonment and Kikyo's death were all caused by the spider half-demon Naraku, who was born from the soul of the bandit Onigumo, who, longing for Kikyo, made a pact with demons to acquire the Shikon Jewel for his own ends. Naraku comes into possession of most of the shards while absorbing demons to increase his power and remove any weaknesses. Inuyasha's group is soon joined after by the demon slayer Sango and her two-tailed demon cat Kirara. Sango's entire clan was killed when they were tricked by Naraku and her younger brother Kohaku fell under his control. Over time, Inuyasha enhances Tessaiga into stronger forms while he contends with Naraku's schemes and minions. Inuyasha's team is loosely allied with Sesshomaru, who also becomes an enemy of Naraku after he attempts to manipulate him into doing his bidding, the resurrected Kikyo who plans to destroy Naraku by purifying the Shikon Jewel once it is completed and him with it, and Kōga, the leader of the eastern wolf demon tribe who seeks to avenge many of his comrades' deaths at the hands of Naraku. As Inuyasha and his companions journey together, he and Kagome begin to fall in love with one another, which is complicated due to Inuyasha's lingering feelings for Kikyo.

Desperately hunted by his enemies, Naraku temporarily removes his human heart and mortally wounds Kikyo. Kohaku, having been previously killed but later revived by Naraku and kept alive and under his control by a Shikon Jewel fragment, eventually regains his free will and memories and attempts to escape Naraku's grasp and avenge his slain family. During that time, Sesshomaru settles things with Inuyasha to enable his brother to perfect Tessaiga to its optimal abilities. Kikyo uses the last of her life force to give Kohaku a second chance at life as Naraku fully reassembles the Shikon Jewel. Although Inuyasha and his allies defeat him for good, realizing his true desire is for Kikyo's love despite his hatred towards her and that it can never be granted, Naraku uses his wish to trap himself and Kagome inside the Shikon Jewel before dying. Revealed to be sentient, the Shikon Jewel intends for Kagome to make a selfish wish so she and Naraku will be trapped in an eternal conflict, thus prolonging its existence; however, with Inuyasha by her side, Kagome wishes for the Shikon Jewel to disappear forever, allowing her to return to her time with the well sealed, and she and Inuyasha lose contact for three years.

In that time, the Sengoku period changes drastically: Sango and Miroku marry and have three children together; Kohaku resumes his journey to become a strong demon slayer with Kirara as his companion; and Shippō trains to make his demon magic stronger. Back in the present, eighteen-year-old Kagome graduates from high school before finally managing to get the Bone Eater's Well in her backyard to work again. Kagome returns to the Sengoku period, where she reunites with Inuyasha, marries him, and continues to train with Kaede to become a topmost-level priestess.

Development
Takahashi wrote Inuyasha after finishing Ranma ½. In contrast to her previous comedic works such as Urusei Yatsura (1978–1987), Maison Ikkoku (1980–1987), and One Pound Gospel (1987–2006), Takahashi wanted to create a darker storyline that was thematically closer to her Mermaid Saga stories. In order to portray violent themes softly, the story was set in the Sengoku period, when wars were common. Takahashi did no notable research for the designs of samurai or castles because she considered such topics common knowledge. By June 2001, a clear ending to the series had not been established because Takahashi still was unsure about how to end the relationship between Inuyasha and Kagome. Furthermore, Takahashi said that she did not have an ending to previous manga she wrote during the beginning, having figured them out as their serialization progressed.

Media

Manga

Inuyasha is written and illustrated by Rumiko Takahashi. The series debuted in Shogakukan's Weekly Shōnen Sunday (issue #50, 1996) on November 13, 1996. Inuyasha finished after an eleven year and seven month run in the magazine (issue #29, 2008) on June 18, 2008. Its 558 chapters were collected in fifty-six tankōbon volumes by Shogakukan, released from April 18, 1997, to February 18, 2009. Shogakukan re-published the series in a 30-volume wide-ban edition, released from January 18, 2013, to June 18, 2015. Takahashi published a special epilogue chapter, titled , in Weekly Shōnen Sunday on February 6, 2013, as part of the "Heroes Come Back" anthology, which comprised short stories by manga artists to raise funds for recovery of the areas afflicted by the 2011 Tōhoku earthquake and tsunami. The chapter was later included in the last volume of the wide-ban edition of the manga in 2015, and was published again in Shōnen Sunday S on October 24, 2020.

In North America, Inuyasha has been licensed for English language release by Viz Media, initially titled as Inu-Yasha. They began publishing the manga in April 1997 in an American comic book format, each issue containing two or three chapters from the original manga, and the last issue was released in February 2003, which covered up until the original Japanese 14th volume. In May 1998, Viz Media began publishing the series in a first trade-paperback edition, with twelve volumes published from July 6, 1998 to October 6, 2002. A second edition began with the 13th volume, released on April 9, 2003, and the first twelve volumes, following this edition, were reprinted as well. Up until the 37th volume, Viz Media published the series in left-to-right orientation, and with the release of the 38th volume on July 14, 2009, they published the remaining volumes in "unflipped" right-to-left page layout. Viz Media published the 56th and final volume of Inuyasha on January 11, 2011. In 2009, Viz Media began publishing the series in their 3-in-1 omnibus volume "VizBig" edition, with the original unflipped chapters. The eighteen volumes were released from November 10, 2009 to February 11, 2014. On December 15, 2020, Viz released all eighteen of these volumes digitally.

Anime

Inuyasha

It was also broadcast on Nippon Television. Avex collected the episodes in a total of seven series of DVD volumes distributed in Japan between May 30, 2001, and July 27, 2005.

In North America, the series was licensed for an English dub release by Viz Media. The series was first run on Adult Swim from August 31, 2002, to October 27, 2006, with reruns from 2006 to 2014. When Toonami became a block on Adult Swim, Inuyasha aired there from November 2012 to March 1, 2014, when the network announced that they had lost the broadcast rights to the series. On August 25, 2017, Starz announced that they would be offering episodes of the series for their Video on Demand service starting September 1, 2017. The series aired in Canada on YTV's Bionix programming block from September 5, 2003, to December 1, 2006. Viz collected the series in a total of 55 DVD volumes, while seven box sets were also released. In September 2020, Funimation announced that they would begin streaming the first 54 episodes of the series and the four films.

Viz Media also released a separate series of ani-manga volumes which are derived from full-color screenshots of the anime episodes. 30 volumes were released from January 14, 2004 to December 9, 2008.

Inuyasha: The Final Act

In 2009's 34th issue of Weekly Shōnen Sunday, published July 22, 2009, it was officially announced that a 26-episode anime adaption of volumes 36 to the end of the manga would be made by the first anime's same cast and crew and would air on Japan's YTV. The following week, Viz Media announced it had licensed the new adaptation, titled . The series premiered on October 3, 2009 in Japan with the episodes being simulcast via Hulu and Weekly Shōnen Sunday in the United States. In other parts of Asia the episodes were aired the same week on Animax Asia. The anime completed its run on March 29, 2010. Aniplex collected the series into a total of seven DVDs released between December 23, 2009, and June 23, 2010.

Viz Media released the series in two DVD or Blu-ray sets which included an English dub. The first thirteen episodes, constituting the first set, were released on November 20, 2012, and the last thirteen episodes, constituting the second set, were released on February 12, 2013. The series began broadcasting in the United States and Canada on Viz Media's online network, Neon Alley, on October 2, 2012. On October 24, 2014, it was announced that Adult Swim would air The Final Act on the Toonami block, beginning on November 15, at 2:00 a.m. EST.

Yashahime: Princess Half-Demon

In May 2020, an anime original spin-off/sequel series was announced, titled , following the journey of Towa Higurashi and Setsuna, Sesshomaru and Rin's fraternal twin daughters, and Moroha, Inuyasha and Kagome's daughter. It premiered on October 3, 2020.

The series is produced by Sunrise, directed by Teruo Sato (season 1) and Masakazu Hishida (season 2) with main character designs by the original creator Rumiko Takahashi. Staff from Inuyasha returned, with Katsuyuki Sumisawa in charge of the scripts, Yoshihito Hishinuma in charge of the anime character designs and Kaoru Wada as composer. The cast includes Sara Matsumoto as Towa Higurashi, Mikako Komatsu as Setsuna, and Azusa Tadokoro as Moroha.

Viz Media announced the rights to digital streaming, EST, and home video release of the series for North and Latin American territories.

Films
There are four animated films with original storylines written by Katsuyuki Sumisawa, the writer for the Inuyasha anime series. The films were released with English subtitles and dubbed audio tracks on Region 1 DVD by Viz Media. Together, the four films have earned over US$20 million in Japanese box offices.

The first film, Inuyasha the Movie: Affections Touching Across Time, was released in 2001. In the film, Inuyasha and his friends confront Menomaru, a demonic moth warrior brought to life by one of the shards.

In the second film, Inuyasha the Movie: The Castle Beyond the Looking Glass, released in 2002, the group seemingly kills Naraku for good and return to their normal lives, only to encounter a new enemy named Kaguya, a character based on the literature The Tale of the Bamboo Cutter.

The third film, Inuyasha the Movie: Swords of an Honorable Ruler, was released in 2003. In it, Inuyasha and Sesshomaru are forced to work together to seal the evil Sō'unga, their father's third sword, when it is awakened from its sheath.

The fourth and final film, Inuyasha the Movie: Fire on the Mystic Island, was released in 2004. It follows Inuyasha and his friends protecting a group of half-demon children from four evil demons on an ancient mystical island.

Original video animation
A 30-minute original video animation titled , was presented on July 30, 2008, at an "It's a Rumic World" exhibit at the Matsuya Ginza department store in Tokyo's Ginza shopping district. The episode uses the original voice cast from the anime series. It was released in Japan on October 20, 2010, in both DVD and Blu-ray formats.

Soundtrack CDs
Multiple soundtracks and character songs were released for the series by Avex Mode. The singles charted at number 63, 76, and 79 respectively on the Oricon chart. The singles charted at number 130, 131, and 112 respectively on the Oricon chart.

On March 24, 2010, Avex released , a best album that contains all the opening and ending theme songs used in the series. The album peaked at number 20 on the Oricon album chart and charted for seven weeks.

Video games

A single title, was released for the Game Boy Advance on January 23, 2003, in Japan.

Inuyasha has been adapted into a mobile game released for Java and Brew handsets on June 21, 2005.

Two titles were released for the PlayStation: an RPG simply titled Inuyasha, and the fighting game Inuyasha: A Feudal Fairy Tale, the latter of which was released in North America. For the PlayStation 2, the two released games were the RPG Inuyasha: The Secret of the Cursed Mask and the fighting game Inuyasha: Feudal Combat, which also received an English version. An English-only RPG, Inuyasha: Secret of the Divine Jewel, was released for the Nintendo DS on January 23, 2007.

Inuyasha appeared in the crossover video game Sunday vs Magazine: Shūketsu! Chōjō Daikessen as a playable character.

Inuyasha's sword, Tessaiga, has appeared in Monster Hunter as a craftable weapon using items gained from a special event.

An English-language original collectible card game created by Score Entertainment that was first released on October 20, 2004.

Light novel
A light novel, written by Tomoko Komparu and illustrated by Rumiko Takahashi, was published by Shogakukan in 2004.

Stage plays
In 2000, a Japanese live-action stage play ran from April through May in the Akasaka ACT Theater in Tokyo, around the same time the anime series began production. The play's script followed the general plot line of the original manga, with a few minor changes to save time. A second run of the play ran from January through February in 2001 at the Akasaka ACT Theater in Tokyo.

In February 2017, it was announced that a stage play adaptation of Inuyasha would be performed at Tennozu Galaxy Theater in Tokyo from April 6–15 of the same year, featuring Yutaka Kyan from Golden Bomber as Inuyasha and Nogizaka46's Yumi Wakatsuki as Kagome.

Reception

Manga
Inuyasha was one of the Manga Division's Jury Recommended Works at the 5th and 12th installments of the Japan Media Arts Festival in 2001 and 2008, respectively. In 2002, the manga won the 47th Shogakukan Manga Award in the shōnen category. On TV Asahi's Manga Sōsenkyo 2021 poll, in which 150,000 people voted for their top 100 manga series, Inuyasha ranked 28th.

As of February 2010, Inuyasha had over 45 million copies in circulation. As of September 2020, the manga had over 50 million copies in circulation. Individual volumes from Inuyasha have been popular in Japan, taking high places in rankings listing sales. In North America, the manga volumes have appeared various times in The New York Times and Diamond Comic Distributors top selling lists. Moreover, in 2005 Inuyasha was one of the most researched series according to Lycos.

Reviewing volume two for Ex.org, Eri Izawa wrote that Inuyasha combines many of Rumiko Takahashi's best elements; "fast paced action, interesting characters, deep doses of imaginative fantasy, a bit of horror, and those famous touches of Takahashi humor." She also praised the "undeniably intelligent and observant" Kagome as refreshing. Izawa described the faults of the series as subtle and minor; feeling that the action sometimes seems to drag a little and that some of the characters are too familiar to those from Takahashi's previous works. Rebecca Bundy began her review of volume 23 of Inuyasha for Anime News Network by claiming; "Twenty three volumes in and this series still packs a serious punch." She called its balance of action, conversation and "reflection" perfect, and noted it had plenty of character development for the main cast, sans Koga. Bundy's sole complaint was that she felt the character designs had changed a modest amount since the beginning of the series. Even though they had not read Inuyasha since around volume six, Manga Life's Penny Kenny said they were able to jump right in with volume 52 thanks in part to the sense of familiarity provided by Takahashi "riffing on the same themes." Kenny stated that Takahashi's genius lies in her "endless improvisations on the standard elements" by adding new enemies and monsters she forces the heroes to up their game and grow as individuals. The reviewer described the art as having little background detail, with Takahashi instead focusing on the characters and their actions. Kenny also noted that, like all of the manga artist's works, the drama is heightened by levity, with each character having their own style of humor.

Anime
The anime of Inuyasha was ranked twenty by TV Asahi of the 100 best anime series in 2006 based on an online survey in Japan. In ICv2's Anime Awards from both 2004 and 2005, the series was the winner in the category of Property of the Year. In the Anime Grand Prix polls by Animage, Inuyasha has appeared various times in the category of Best Anime, taking third place in 2003. In the American Anime Awards from 2007, Inuyasha was a nominee in the categories of Best Cast, Best Long Series, and Best Anime Feature, but lost to Fullmetal Alchemist and Final Fantasy VII: Advent Children, respectively. A 2019 NHK poll of 210,061 people saw Inuyasha named Takahashi's best animated work. Inuyasha and Sesshomaru were voted first and third place respectively in her characters category.

The English DVDs from the series had sold over one million copies between March 2003 and November 2004, with the first film's DVD topping the Nielsen VideoScan anime bestseller list for three weeks. , Viz Media have sold more than  Inuyasha home video units. Mania Entertainment listed the series in an article ranking anime series that required a reboot, criticizing the series' repetitiveness.

See also
The Holy Pearl, a 2011 Chinese TV series partially inspired by Inuyasha.

Notes

References

External links

 Shonen Sunday'''s official Inuyasha'' manga website 
 Viz's official Inuyasha website
 Sunrise's official Inuyasha anime website 
 Yomiuri Television's official Inuyasha anime website 
 Official Sunrise Inuyasha: The Final Act anime website 
 

Inuyasha
1996 manga
2000 anime television series debuts
2009 anime television series debuts
Adventure anime and manga
Anime and manga about time travel
Anime series based on manga
Aniplex
Bandai Namco franchises
Demons in anime and manga
Exorcism in anime and manga
Fiction about shapeshifting
Isekai anime and manga
Isekai novels and light novels
Japanese mythology in anime and manga
Japanese time travel television series
Madman Entertainment anime
Manga adapted into films
Multiple time paths in fiction
Nippon TV original programming
Odex
Television shows about reincarnation
Romance anime and manga
Sengoku period in fiction
Shinto in fiction
Shogakukan manga
Shōnen manga
Sunrise (company)
Time travel in television
Toonami
Viz Media anime
Viz Media manga
Winners of the Shogakukan Manga Award for shōnen manga
Works by Rumiko Takahashi
Yakshas
Yōkai in anime and manga
Yomiuri Telecasting Corporation original programming